Aulaconotus satoi is a species of beetle in the family Cerambycidae. It was described by Hasegawa in 2003.

References

Agapanthiini
Beetles described in 2003